The 1944 United States presidential election in Colorado took place on November 7, 1944, as part of the 1944 United States presidential election. State voters chose six representatives, or electors, to the Electoral College, who voted for president and vice president.

Colorado was won by Governor Thomas E. Dewey (R–New York), running with Governor John Bricker, with 53.21% of the popular vote, against incumbent President Franklin D. Roosevelt (D–New York), running with Senator Harry S. Truman, with 46.40% of the popular vote.

Results

Results by county

References

Colorado
1944
1944 Colorado elections